The Inflatable Antenna Experiment (IAE) was a NASA experiment that began on May 19, 1996, consisting of an inflatable antenna made of mylar which was launched from the Space Shuttle Endeavour during the 1996 STS-77 mission, in cooperation with the satellite Spartan-207.

The antenna correctly inflated, separating from Spartan-207, before re-entering Earth's atmosphere a few days later, on 22 May. IAE was intended to pave the way for the development of lightweight inflatable structures for space applications. The IAE was constructed by LGarde, Inc., an American aerospace company based in Orange County, CA.

References

NASA satellites
Antennas
Space science experiments
Spacecraft launched in 1996